Beaver Bottoms is a valley in northeastern Beaver and southeastern Millard counties, Utah, United States.

Description
It is drained to the north by the Beaver River through the mouth of the valley south of the Cricket Mountains and north of Black Rock. Cove Creek drains into the Bottoms from the east and sinks into the sands there before it can join the Beaver River.

See also
 List of valleys of Utah

References

External links

Valleys of Utah
Valleys of Beaver County, Utah
Valleys of Millard County, Utah